A  is a traditional Japanese teapot mainly used for brewing green tea. They're also common in the Nizhnij Novgorod area of Russia, where they're called Kisyushka (a term derived from Japanese). 

The common misconception is that a kyūsu always has a side handle. However, the word "kyūsu" merely means "teapot", even though in common usage kyūsu usually does refer to a teapot with a side handle. 

Tokoname ware is known for its kyūsu. In smaller types, some of the lids can be crafted in such a way that they will not fall off due to water adhesion. The spout also has to be crafted with an angle that no drops will leak back from it while pouring.

See also
 Japanese tea ceremony
 Tetsubin, a cast iron Japanese kettle

References

External links 

Japanese tea
Teapots
Japanese pottery
Japanese words and phrases

ja:急須